TXI, formerly Texas Industries, was a manufacturing company.  The company was focused on the production of heavy construction materials in the southwestern United States market (e.g. Texas and California). 

TXI mainly focuses on cement, Portland, masonry and oil well cements, aggregates, and other concrete related products. Until 2012, Texas Industries owned 82 manufacturing facilities in six states.

History

TXI was founded in 1946. In 1994, with an annual revenue of $614M, the company ranked 500th on the Fortune 500 list by annual revenue.

In January 2014, Martin Marietta Materials (MLM), a rival provider of construction materials, agreed to buy TXI for $2.06 billion in stock. The combined company will operate under the name Martin Marietta with 7,000 employees and headquarters in Raleigh, N.C., Martin Marietta’s current home.

As of July 2, 2014, TXI became a wholly owned subsidiary of Martin Marietta Materials, Inc. TXI is now headquartered in Dallas, Texas.

Key facilities

When the plant was built it was the largest cement plant in the country.

Former key facilities
The Chaparral Steel plant is next to TXI's cement plant in Midlothian.  Chaparral Steel was spun off from TXI and later purchased by Gerdau in 2007 for $4.2 billion. At that time, Chaparral Steel was the second-largest producer of structural steel beams in North America and a major producer of steel bar product.

References

External links
TXI Official Website
MS Concrete Construction

Manufacturing companies established in 1946
Companies formerly listed on the New York Stock Exchange
Manufacturing companies based in Dallas
Cement companies of the United States
Building materials companies of the United States
1946 establishments in Texas
Defunct manufacturing companies based in Texas